Diaphania grisealis is a moth in the family Crambidae. It was described by Peter Maassen in 1890. It is found in Ecuador and Costa Rica.

References

Moths described in 1890
Diaphania